Marco Palmezzano (1460–1539) was an Italian painter and architect, belonging to the Forlì painting school, who painted in a style recalling earlier Northern Renaissance models. He was mostly active near Forlì.

Biography
Palmezzano was born and died in Forlì, Romagna.

After his initial training with the painter Melozzo da Forlì — who had collaborated with Piero della Francesca and was widely esteemed as a master of perspective and foreshortening techniques— Palmezzano went to Rome in the early 1490s.
 
It is rumored that Palmezzano may have then traveled to Jerusalem to join the team painting frescoes at the Holy Cross church there, but no documentary evidence exists. He is, however, noted in property records as residing in Venice in 1495. Shortly thereafter, Palmezzano returned to Forlì, where he spent the rest of his long life—apparently with only brief excursions connected with commissions in other places in the region—until his death in 1539.

Among his pupils in Forlì, are listed Baldassarre Carrari il Giovane.

Work
Palmezzano's studio was prolific in producing altarpieces, most commonly featuring the iconic arrangement of an enthroned Virgin with child on her lap, while below, symmetrically sited in the foreground are flanking saints. Venetian painting, in general, and the work of Giovanni Bellini and Cima da Conegliano, in particular, were to remain the most powerful influences on Palmezzano's output. Moreover, he remained faithful to the Venetian style of the later 15th and early 16th century. Mannerism entirely passed him by, and he seemed immune to subsequent developments in Venetian painting. One of the most attractive facets of Palmezzano's oeuvre are the distinctive and suggestive landscapes that form the backdrops of many of his altarpieces. These are a blend of the ideal and lyrical, and of the observed reality of the Apennine foothills and mountains to the south of Forli for which Palmezzano clearly had a real affection. These landscapes are also employed to subtle and imaginative effect to convey the symbolic religious messages of the works.

Chronology of work

Crucifixion (early period) in the Pinacoteca Civica of Forlì.
Virgin with Child between Saint John the Baptist and Saint Margaret (1492)
Decorations in the Chapel Feo in Church of San Biagio at Forlì, destroyed in bombing during World War II (1493-34)
Annunciation altarpiece for Forlì's Carmelite church (1495-57)
Virgin and Child with Saints Giacomo and Michele (1490s)
Madonna and Child with Saints (1493) Pinacoteca di Brera
Virgin and Child with Saints John the Baptist and Filippo Bennizi - Gallery of Antique Art of Fondazione  Cassa di Risparmio di Cesena
Virgin and Child with Saint Francis of Assisi and Saint Catherine of Alexandria, created in Matelica (1501)
Crucifixion between Gualberto and Mary Magdalene
Holy Communion of Apostles (1506) - Oil on wood, Pinacoteca Civica, Forlì
The Dead Christ in the Tomb with the Virgin Mary and Saints (1506) - Oil on wood, National Gallery, London
Virgin and Child Enthroned between Saints John the Baptist and Jerome (1510) - Oil on wood panel, Vatican Picture Gallery
Dead Christ with Two Angels (1510) - Tempera on panel, 81 x 79 cm, Musée du Louvre, Paris
Holy Family with Saint Elizabeth and the Infant Saint John (1515) - Oil on wood panel, Vatican Picture Gallery
Hospital Beaten for Forlì (1517)
The Baptism of Christ (1535) - Oil on panel, 90 x 70 cm, Pinacoteca Civica, Forlì
The Baptism of Christ (c. 1535) - Oil on wood panel, National Gallery of Victoria, Melbourne
Virgin and Child Surrounded by Saints (1537) - Oil on wood panel, Vatican Picture Gallery
Christ Bearing the Cross - Oil on wood panel, Vatican Picture Gallery
Madonna and Child with the Infant Saint John the Baptist - Oil on panel, 65 x 52 cm, Private collection
The Annunciation with City by the Sea - Oil on wood panel, Vatican Picture Gallery
Saint Jerome and Saint Francis in the Desert, Loyola University Art Museum, Chicago

Sources
Francis Russell, Marco Palmezzano: Forlì, in The Burlington magazine, 148.2006, 1237, p. 294-295.

References

1460s births
1539 deaths
People from Forlì
15th-century Italian painters
Italian male painters
16th-century Italian painters
Italian Renaissance painters